Kaadhal Kondein is a 2003 Indian Tamil-language romantic psychological thriller film written and directed by Selvaraghavan, starring his brother Dhanush and newcomers Sonia Agarwal and Sudeep Sarangi, while Nagesh and Daniel Balaji play supporting roles. The film, which has music scored by Yuvan Shankar Raja and cinematography handled by Aravind Krishna, released on 4 July 2003, winning critical acclaim and becoming a commercial success upon release. The film is considered a breakthrough for Dhanush as it catapulted him into the league of lead actors in the Tamil film industry.

The film was remade in Telugu in 2004 as Nenu, in Bangla in 2004 as Onno Manush, in Kannada in 2009 as Ravana and in Bengali in 2010 as Amanush.

Plot
In 2003, Vinod (Dhanush), an orphan, has grown up under the care of church father Rozario (Nagesh). He is an introvert but a genius. He scores well in his +2 exams and gets free admission into one of the top engineering colleges in Tamil Nadu. He is forcibly sent to Chennai to college by Rozario where he is a complete misfit in class. Though shunned by the rest of his class, Divya (Sonia Agarwal) becomes his friend, and he gradually warms up to her. Vinod excels in his studies, and everyone begins to see him differently. His feelings for Divya soon turn into love, but he realizes that Divya considers him only as a friend and learns that she is in love with another classmate, Aadhi (Sudeep).

Divya's father is enraged on learning of her love. He locks her up in her room and prevents her from contacting anyone. Vinod comes and requests to meet her on the pretext of purchasing second-hand clothes for himself. Pitying Vinod, her father allows him to meet Divya. Vinod escapes with Divya and convinces her that she will meet Aadhi in Ooty. Vinod has set up a secret place in Ooty to execute his plan of wooing Divya. He makes her stay with him, while convincing her to stay by talking about Aadhi's arrival. On one such day, he reveals information about his past.

In 1995, near the forest of Hosur, a gang runs a brick factory which employs only children as labour. The gang's leader is a ruthless money-lending lady who buys orphans for work. The boys and girls are enslaved under highly inhuman conditions and work for 16 hours a day. Vinod, a 13-year-old-boy, is sold by his uncle and aunt for money after his parents died in an accident. He befriends three boys and one girl of the same age. One day, Vinod tries to inform the cruelty the children are exposed, to an officer who later accepts a bribe and leaves. He is then sent to solitary confinement within a metal box under the sun as punishment. Vinod's female friend agrees to the sexual advances made by the owners husband in exchange for freeing Vinod from the metal box, yet she dies during the sexual assault and the murder is covered up. Weeks later, the boys, lead by Vinod, rebel and kill the entire gang. They manage to vandalise the place and escape, following which the government takes over the plant, and all children are admitted into an orphanage run by Father Rozario.

Divya is touched by his past. Incidentally, the police and Aadhi arrive at the place. While Vinod was away to get some food, they try to explain to Divya that Vinod is a psychopath, with the evidence of a dead body in his earlier residence. Divya scoffs at their claims, citing his gentlemanly behaviour over the days that she has been alone with him. Vinod, learning that the police have arrived at the scene, begins to indulge in violence. He opens fire, killing a police constable. Forcing them out of their hideout, he manages to evade the police inspector and Aadhi and successfully brings Divya back to their original place of stay. Divya soon identifies the wolf in the sheep's clothing. Vinod pleads with her, telling Divya that all he wanted in his life was her presence, but she called him a friend and stated her inability to accept him as her partner for life.

Meanwhile, Aadhi regains consciousness and comes back to attack Vinod and rescue his girlfriend. A violent fight follows, where Vinod treats Aadhi with disdain. The fight culminates with Vinod, Aadhi, and Divya teetering at the edge of a slippery cliff. While Divya clutches a tree bark tightly, Vinod and Aadhi slip out and barely manage to hold either of her hands. Divya is forced to choose between her boyfriend and friend. Aadhi's pleas notwithstanding, Divya does not have the heart to kill Vinod, who smiles at Divya and he himself leaves hand falling to his death. The film closes with a dead Vinod looking up, with a smile on his face.

Cast
 Dhanush as Vinoth
 Sonia Agarwal as Divya
 Sudeep as Aadhi Kesavan
 Nagesh as Father Rozario
 Daniel Balaji as Police Inspector
 Srikanth as Divya's father
 Hemalatha as Devi, Vinod's childhood friend
 Rambo Rajkumar
 Gowthami Vembunathan as the orphanage caretaker
 A. K. Abbas as Vinod's childhood friend

Production
Following the success of the previous film Thulluvadho Ilamai (2002), the team chose to collaborate again with the psychotic romantic thriller Kaadhal Kondein, credited as Selvaraghavan's directorial debut. Jyothika was selected as lead heroine. Due to her unavailability lead to chose a newcomer, Sonia Agarwal. The venture, produced by his home production, also marked the first collaboration of Selvaraghavan with cinematographer Arvind Krishna, whom he would later associate with newcomer Sonia Agarwal. Selvaraghavan had written the script for the film in the late 1990s and had first narrated the story to Dhanush in their shared bedroom at home, before asking him to play the lead role of Vinod.

Music

For Kaadhal Kondein, director Selvaraghavan and music composer Yuvan Shankar Raja came together again after their earlier successful collaboration in Thulluvadho Ilamai (2002), for which Selvaraghavan worked as a writer. The soundtrack of Kaadhal Kondein released on 20 March 2003, featuring seven tracks with lyrics written by Palani Bharathi and Na. Muthukumar. The music, especially the film score, received universal critical acclaim, establishing composer Yuvan Shankar Raja as one of the "most sought after music directors" in the Tamil film industry.

Most of the songs from this film were plagiarized from various sources: for example the song "Kadhal Mattum Purivathillai" was plagiarised from the song "Raven" in the album of "Tra" by "Hedningarna" and the song "Manasu Rendum" was copied from "A rose in the wind" by "Anggun". More than one year after the release of the film, an "original soundtrack" was released, that followed the Hollywood-style. It was said to be the first time, that an original soundtrack was released for a film in India as the soundtracks released in India do not contain any film score pieces but full songs that feature in the film itself. The OST of Kaadhal Kondein contains 20 tracks overall, which includes the seven earlier released tracks, four "montage" bit songs, that featured in the film, but not in the soundtrack, and nine pieces from the actual film score, which were titled as "Theme Music".

Reception

Critical response
The film opened in July 2003 to critical acclaim and commercial success. A reviewer from The Hindu noted, "his story, screenplay, dialogue and direction are focussed and hit the bull's eye straightway — hardly missing the mark."

Accolades

 2004: Filmfare Best Actor Award Nominated - Dhanush
 2004: Filmfare Best Female Debut (South) - Sonia Agarwal
Nominations
 2004: Filmfare Best Director Award - Selvaraghavan

Remakes
Since its release, the film has been remade into several Indian languages; Boney Kapoor bought the rights to remake the film in Hindi, but the project did not materialise. The film was later remade in Telugu as Nenu (2004), in Kannada as Ravana (2009), in Bangladeshi Bengali as Onno Manush (2004) and in Indian Bengali as Amanush (2010).

Legacy
The film proved to be career breakthroughs for both Selvaraghavan and Dhanush in the Tamil film industry. The success of the song "Devathaiyai Kandaen" prompted Boopathy Pandian to name his 2005 film starring Dhanush after the song title.

Dharshan dances as "Divya,divya" inspired by the film.

References

External links
 

2003 drama films
2000s Tamil-language films
2003 films
2003 directorial debut films
Films scored by Yuvan Shankar Raja
Films directed by Selvaraghavan
Indian drama films
Tamil films remade in other languages
Indian romantic thriller films
Tamil-language psychological thriller films